Toulouse – Lasbordes Airport  is a small non-commercial airport in the commune of Balma, situated  east of the city center of Toulouse, both located in the Haute-Garonne department of the Midi-Pyrénées region in southwest France.

Facilities
It has a  asphalt runway for light airplanes and a  grass strip for microlights. The runways are located very close to the large highway surrounding Toulouse.

From the air, the airport is easily found by looking for a large upright Ariane space rocket located in Cité de l'espace (Space Museum) on the opposite side of the motorway.

References

External links 
 
 Official French aeronautical information

Airports in Occitania (administrative region)
Transport in Toulouse
Buildings and structures in Haute-Garonne